Prisoner 1040 is a 1958 Argentine thriller film directed by Rubén W. Cavalloti. The film involves an honest man who is wrongly imprisoned and explores the horror within the cold walls of the prison.

Cast
Narciso Ibáñez Menta as José Rossini
Walter Vidarte	as El Zorrito
Carlos Estrada as Roberto Mayorga
Juan Carlos Lamas as Maidana
Tito Alonso as El Potrillo
Pedro Buchardo as Policía
Beto Gianola as Preso
Pascual Nacarati as Policía
Alicia Bellán as Rossina
Josefa Goldar as Doña María
Enrique Kossi as Oficial
Ariel Absalón as Enrique Medina
Rafael Diserio as Vicente

External links

 

1958 films
1950s Spanish-language films
Argentine black-and-white films
1950s thriller films
1950s prison films
Films directed by Rubén W. Cavallotti
Argentine thriller drama films
1950s Argentine films